The 2014–15 1. FC Union Berlin season was the club's sixth consecutive season in the 2. Bundesliga.

Competitions

2. Bundesliga

Results

League table

DFB-Pokal

Squad statistics

|-
! colspan=10 style=background:#dcdcdc; text-align:center| Goalkeepers

|-
! colspan=10 style=background:#dcdcdc; text-align:center| Defenders

|-
! colspan=10 style=background:#dcdcdc; text-align:center| Midfielders

|-
! colspan=14 style=background:#dcdcdc; text-align:center| Forwards

Notes

References

Union Berlin
1. FC Union Berlin seasons